Peluso is a surname of Italian origin. Notable instances of the surname include:

Father Angelo Peluso (1801–1854), Franciscan friar
Anthony Peluso (born 1989), Canadian professional ice hockey player
Cezar Peluso (born 1942), Brazilian jurist
Deanna C. C. Peluso (born 1979), American-Canadian musician
Federico Peluso (born 1984), Italian footballer
Jessimae Peluso (born 1982), American stand-up comedian and television personality
Lisa Peluso (born 1964), American soap opera actress
Maurizio Peluso (born 1985), Italian professional footballer
Mike Peluso (ice hockey, born 1965), American ice hockey forward with 458 NHL games
Mike Peluso (ice hockey, born 1974), American ice hockey right winger with 38 NHL games
Nathy Peluso (born 1995), Argentine singer, songwriter, dancer and pedagogist
Tony Peluso (1950–2010), American guitarist and record producer
Vincenzo Peluso, Italian actor

Fictional characters:
 Brian Peluso, character from Conviction (2006 TV series)